Frank Nikolay (September 1, 1922 – December 10, 2011) was an American politician and lawyer.

Born in Day, Wisconsin, Nikolay served in the Wisconsin National Guard and the United States Navy. He received his bachelor's degree and law degrees from University of Wisconsin–Madison and then practiced law in Abbotsford, Wisconsin. He was the United States Attorney for the Western District of Wisconsin from 1952 to 1953. He served on the Clark County, Wisconsin County Board of Supervisors. He also served in the Wisconsin State Assembly from 1959 to 1965 and 1969 as a Democrat. He died in Abbotsford, Wisconsin.

Notes

1922 births
2011 deaths
County supervisors in Wisconsin
People from Abbotsford, Wisconsin
People from Marathon County, Wisconsin
University of Wisconsin–Madison alumni
University of Wisconsin Law School alumni
United States Attorneys for the Western District of Wisconsin
United States Navy personnel of World War II
Democratic Party members of the Wisconsin State Assembly